The Depreciation Guild was an American dream pop and shoegaze band from Brooklyn, New York, formed in 2005 by lead vocalist and songwriter Kurt Feldman and guitarist Adrian Hashizume. Before disbanding, their lineup included Feldman and Christoph Hochheim (who later became the drummer and touring guitarist, respectively, for indie pop band the Pains of Being Pure at Heart), joined for live performances by Anton Hochheim on percussion and Raphael Radna on bass guitar.

History 
Their debut, digital-only EP Nautilus was released by chiptune label 8bitpeoples in 2006, and their debut album In Her Gentle Jaws followed as a self-released free download in 2007. Kanine Records picked the band up in 2009 and reissued their debut album with some remastering. A second full-length, Spirit Youth, followed in mid-2010. The band also did remixes for artists such as Oh No Ono and Chateleine. Their song "Dream About Me" was featured in the 2010 film Kaboom.

In December 2010, they announced on their Facebook page that they would be disbanding after their final show in January 2011, citing musical differences within the band. The band played their scheduled final show on January 8, 2011 at Brooklyn's Rock Shop. Since their separation, Kurt Feldman has continued to be a member of the Pains of Being Pure at Heart, and also began his own solo career as Ice Choir. Christoph Hochheim also began his solo career, as Ablebody.

In August 2013, the original lineup of Kurt Feldman and Adrian Hashizume reunited for a one-off performance of In Her Gentle Jaws in its entirety at Glasslands Gallery in Brooklyn.

On March 8, 2023, the Depreciation Guild reunited to perform their first show in a decade at New York City's Mercury Lounge, celebrating the 20th anniversary of Kanine Records.

Discography

Studio albums
In Her Gentle Jaws (self-released, 2007; Kanine Records, 2009)
Spirit Youth (Kanine Records, 2010)

Extended plays
Nautilus EP (8bitpeoples, 2006)

Singles
"Dream About Me" single (Kanine Records, 2009)
"Blue Lily" single (Kanine Records, 2010)

References

Indie rock musical groups from New York (state)
American shoegaze musical groups
Nintendocore musical groups
Musical groups from Brooklyn
Musical groups established in 2005
Kanine Records artists
Musical groups disestablished in 2011
Musical groups reestablished in 2013
8bitpeoples artists